Pat Lindsey (born May 17, 1952) is an American professional golfer who played on the PGA Tour.

Amateur career 
Lindsey was born, raised, and still makes his home in Toledo, Ohio. He was introduced to golf by his father, an orthodontist, and top amateur golfer. A 1970 graduate of Maumee Valley Country Day School, he went on to attend the University of South Florida in Tampa, Florida graduating in 1975.

Professional career 
Lindsey turned professional in 1975. He spent four-plus years on mini tours and working as a club professional. He qualified for the PGA Tour in 1979 and competed through the 1987 season. His career year in professional golf was 1983 when he finished 67th on the money list with four top-10 finishes including a win at the B.C. Open by four strokes over Gil Morgan. His best finish in a major championship was T-74 at the 1983 PGA Championship. After retiring as a touring professional in 1987, Lindsey has held various positions in sales and marketing with real estate developers in the Toledo area.

After turning 50 in 2002, Lindsey played in a very limited number of Champions Tour events. He and his wife, Julie, have two daughters, Maggie and Hannah.

Professional wins (1)

PGA Tour wins (1)

See also 

 Spring 1979 PGA Tour Qualifying School graduates

References

External links

American male golfers
PGA Tour golfers
Golfers from Ohio
University of South Florida alumni
Sportspeople from Toledo, Ohio
Maumee Valley Country Day School alumni
1952 births
Living people